Rino is both a masculine Italian given name and a feminine Japanese given name (written: ,  or  in katakana). Notable people with the name include:

Italian name
Rino Agostinis (born 1953), Canadian soccer player
Rino Albertarelli (1908–1974), Italian comics artist and illustrator
Rino Barillari (born 1945), Italian photographer
Rino Benedetti (1928–2002), Italian cyclist
Rino Corso Fougier (1894–1963), Italian Air Force general
Rino De Candido (born 1954), Italian cyclist
Rino Della Negra (1923–1944), French footballer
Rino Di Silvestro (1932–2009), Italian film director, screenwriter, producer and actor
Rino Ferrario (1926–2012), Italian footballer
Rino Fisichella (born 1951), Italian titular archbishop
Rino Formica (born 1927), Italian politician
Rino Gasparrini (born 1992), Italian cyclist
Rino Gaetano (1950–1981), Italian musician
Rino Genovese (1905–1967), Italian actor
Rino Iuliano (born 1984), Italian footballer
Rino Lupo (1888–1934), Italian film director
Rino Marchesi (born 1937), Italian footballer and manager
Rino Mondellini (1908–1974), Italian art director
Rino Parenti (1895–1953), Italian fascist
Rino Passigato (born 1944), Italian titular archbishop
Rino Piccolo, Italian film producer
Rino Pretto (born 1959), Australian rules footballer
Rino Pucci (1922–1986), Italian cyclist
Rino Rappuoli (born 1952), American immunologist
Rino Romano (born 1969), Canadian voice actor
Rino Rossi (1889–1974), Italian judge
Rino Salviati (1922–2016), Italian singer, guitarist and actor
Rino Serri (1933–2006), Italian Communist Party politician
Rino Vernizzi (born 1946), Italian classical bassoonist
Rino Zampilli (born 1984), Italian cyclist

Japanese name
, Japanese gravure idol, actress, singer and voice actress
, Japanese actress
, Japanese dancer and choreographer
, Japanese singer, idol and actress

Others
Rino Anto (born 1988), Indian footballer
Rino Thunder (1933–2003), American actor
Rino Tirikatene, New Zealand politician

Italian masculine given names
Japanese feminine given names